The Phonoscène was an antecedent of music video and was regarded by Michel Chion, Noël Burch and Richard Abel as a forerunner of sound film.  The first Phonoscènes were presented by Léon Gaumont in 1902 in France.  The first official presentation in the United Kingdom took place at Buckingham Palace in 1907. The last phonoscène was presented in 1917.

History 

The Phonoscène was a forerunner of sound film.  It combined a chronophone sound recording with a chronograph film shot with actors lip-synching to the sound recording.  The recording and film were synchronized by a mechanism patented by Léon Gaumont in 1902.  The first Phonoscènes were presented by Gaumont in 1902 in France.

Introduction in London 

Phonoscènes were presented at Buckingham Palace on 4 April 1907 before Alexandra of Denmark, the Dowager Empress of Russia, the Prince and Princess of Wales and their children, The Princess Victoria, The Hon. Charlotte Knollys, General Sir Dighton Probyn, V.C., Mdlle. Ozeroff, The Hon. Sidney Greville (Royal Household of the United Kingdom), Colonel Blocklehurst and Colonel Frederick. The "singing pictures", as the British press called them, were projected on a screen over a bank of palms. The programme was a selection of phonoscènes previously presented at the London Hippodrome, as follows:

 The Miserere scene from Il Trovatore,
 The Captain's song and chorus from H.M.S. Pinafore,
Tit-Willow from The Mikado,
This little Girl and That, a song and dance from The Little Michus, and
The Serenade from Charles Gounod's opera Faust.

Belle Époque 
The three major french Belle Époque celebrities, Félix Mayol, Dranem and Polin were recorded by Alice Guy-Blaché using the Chronophone Sound-on-disc system to make phonoscènes.

Last phonoscène to be projected and heard 
J'ai du Cinéma was the last presented phonoscène at the Gaumont Palace ("Greatest Cinema Theatre of the world") on 29 June 1917.

Notes

External links 
 A presentation of the phonoscene phenomenon (fr)

Film sound production
History of film
Film and video technology
Motion picture film formats